George Nicholas may refer to:
 George Nicholas (politician), American lawyer, planter and politician
 George Nicholas (footballer), English footballer
 George Nicholas (animator), American animator
 Big Nick Nicholas (George Walker Nicholas), American jazz saxophonist and singer

See also
 Nicholas George, English cricketer